Bruce Evans may refer to:

 Bruce Evans (baseball), American baseball player
 Bruce Evans (politician) (1925–2012), Australian politician
 Bruce Evans (bishop) (1929–1993), Anglican bishop and author
 Bruce A. Evans (born 1946), American film director
 Bruce R. Evans (born c. 1959), American venture capitalist, corporate director and philanthropist